The  is the tentative name for an underground heavy rail line under construction, which will run north-south through Osaka City, primarily under the avenue . It has long been pursued by West Japan Railway Company (JR West) and Nankai Railway in order to connect the Yamatoji Line (Kansai Main Line) and Nankai Main Line with Shin-Osaka Station, greatly enhancing both companies' connections to Kansai Airport and Wakayama Prefecture. As of 18 March 2023, the tracks through the northern terminus at Osaka Station and adjoining platforms were opened for Haruka and Kuroshio services as well as ordinary trains on the Osaka Higashi Line.

Background 
While both JR and Nankai operate trains to Wakayama (via the Hanwa Line and the Nankai Main Line, respectively) and to Kansai Airport (via the Kansai Airport Line and the Nankai Airport Line, respectively), neither route is ideal. For JR, trains must use the Osaka Loop Line past Tennoji Station, both creating and being affected by delays on that line, and bypassing JR Namba Station, the company's closest link to Osaka's commercial center. For Nankai, all trains go direct to its terminal in Namba, precluding links to points further north.

Plans were drawn up in the mid-2000s to alleviate the problems for both companies through the construction of a new underground line, primarily under the north-south thoroughfare Naniwasuji (hence the name), branching at its south end to connect both the Yamatoji Line (Kansai Main Line) terminal at JR Namba, and a Nankai line, with Shin-Osaka via a new underground route through what was then the Umeda Freight Terminal. The Umeda portion of this plan was eventually incorporated into Phase II of the Osaka Higashi Line, with provisions in place for eventual construction of the Naniwasuji Line itself.

Ridership on the line from the two companies is expected to reach approximately 240,000 people per day.

JR West 

The issue surrounding Osaka Station for JR is set to be alleviated in fiscal 2022 with the opening of the first section (incorporated into the Osaka Higashi Line project, although construction delays have pushed its opening back 4 years compared to the rest of Phase II), which will terminate at new underground platforms of Osaka Station on a route replacing the aboveground Umeda Freight Line. Without constructing an entirely new line through central Osaka, however, the other problems remain.

JR West is expected to be in charge of the section between Umeda Station and JR Namba Station.

Hankyu Railway 
Hankyu Railway has also announced tentative plans to build a new underground line connecting the Naniwasuji Line to Juso and possibly a Shin-Osaka Station of its own.

Nankai Railway 
Early plans for Nankai called for moving the Shiomibashi Line (the northern end of the Kōya Line) underground and connecting to the Naniwasuji Line via Shiomibashi Station (thus upgrading and increasing traffic on an otherwise lightly traveled, local route), but the company ultimately rejected this routing in favor of one via a new underground station at Namba.

History 
On 9 July 2019, the railway business was approved by the Ministry of Land, Infrastructure, and Transportation under the railway business act. Construction of the project was approved in February 2020.

In February 2023, track switching work took place between the 11th and the 13th of that month (including the decomissioning of the former Umeda Freight Line). Before then, JR passenger trains used a single-track freight spur from Osaka Station to join the Osaka Loop Line at Nishi-Kujō. Track switching was finished within the allotted timeframe and the Haruka and Kuroshio have since been using the new tracks. 

The new underground platforms at Osaka Station opened for service on 18 March 2023.

Current plans 
Current plans are to begin construction once the Osaka Higashi Line opens to Osaka Station, with completion anticipated in spring 2031. Total construction costs, including provisions for the line at Kita-Umeda, are projected to total 330 billion yen.

Stations

References

External links 

 JR West Press Release
 Kansai Rapid Railway
 Naniwasuji Line Map (in Japanese), JR West 
 Osaka Prefecture "Naniwasuji Line"

Passenger rail transport
Rail transport in Japan
2031 in rail transport